Lounis Aït Menguellet is an Algerian singer born on January 17, 1950, in Ighil Bouammas, Tizi Ouzou Province in the Kabylie region. Lounis Aït Menguellet sings in the berber language (kabyle variant) and is certainly one of the most popular and charismatic artists of the contemporary kabyle music scene.

He is a poet-musician who has become something of a symbol of the kabyle demands for recognition. Kabylie has been the setting for many fierce confrontations. Although Lounis's songs are frequently about Kabylie and its history and its present suffering and misery, he is always quick to state that he isn't a politician and he doesn't get involved in politics. However, few can deny the political clout of his songs or their political and sometimes very biting and critical messages.

Many critics of Lounis Aït Menguellet's career like to see it as two distinct parts and because that is a generally accepted view it will be the one offered here. The first part is seen as being centred on the production of love songs and nostalgia. Frequently there are references to a lost love. The songs tend to be shorter than he produces today. Typical songs from this period are Thalt Ayam (Three Days) and Tayri (Love). The second part of his career is characterised by longer songs.

Recordings
Yenna-d Umghar (The Wise Man Has Spoken) is characterised by more complex music and a much more careful presentation of lyrics in Kabyle, French and Arabic with a brief summary in English. The Lounis of Yenna-d Umghar is a far cry from the Lounis of the early work which is now quite hard to come by. The Lounis of Yenna-d Umghar is more perhaps accessible to European ears, at once alien and familiar. It is indeed a beautiful work, made all the more effective once the poetry is understood. When he presented Yenna-d Umghar on 16 January 2005 at the Maison de la Culture, Tizi Ouzou, on the occasion of his 55th birthday, he said that the artist could only draw people's attention to their lives and appeal to their consciences. He added that it was still a mission and he didn't consider himself capable of bringing solutions to the problems.

The latest album is Tawriqt tacebhant - (The Blank Sheet) and was released in August 2010. The title has caused some discussion in Kabyle circles because it is only comparatively recently that Kabyle has become a written language again and many of the older generation don't read and write Kabyle though they do read and write in French. The title song talks about the struggles of writing the poem and how the poet is faced with a blank sheet, he is scared that Inspiration (which is personified) will not meet him on the page. Resigned to failure, he goes outside and finds himself thinking about the nature of his task and he realises that actually what he wants to say is there, he just has to do it. He returns to the blank page and writes the poem which he leaves as an inspiration to everyone else. Whenever we start a new task that we find daunting, the poem will be there as inspiration and guidance.

Tawriqt tacebhant was to contain a Kabyle version of Bob Dylan's Blowin' in the Wind. However, versions of the CD circulating in the UK at least, contained the lyrics to the Kabyle version but not the song itself.

Discography

Bibliography
Tassadit Yacine, « Aït Menguellet chante », Préface de Kateb Yacine, Paris, la Découverte, 1989.
Mohammed Djellaoui, « L’image poétique dans l’œuvre de Lounis Aït Menguellet - Du patrimoine à l’innovation » (Essai) - Éditions Les Pages Bleues, Alger, 2005.

External links
The official website of Lounis Ait Menguellet: http://www.aitmenguellet.net/

1950 births
Berber musicians
Berber poets
Kabyle people
Living people
People from Iboudraren
20th-century Algerian  male  singers
21st-century Algerian  male singers